Agar is a gelatinous substance with culinary and microbiological uses.

Agar may also refer to :

Places

Asia 
 Agar, Madhya Pradesh, a city and municipality in the state of Madhya Pradesh, India, former capital of the Parmar Rajput kingdom
 Agar (Vidhan Sabha constituency) the Madhya Pradesh constituency centered around the town
 Agar Malwa district, Madhya Pradesh, India
 Agar, Gujarat, a village and former princely state in Rewa Kantha, India
 Agar, Turkmenistan, a town

Elsewhere 
 Agar, South Dakota, a US town
 Agar Town, a short-lived area in central London
 Agar's Island, Bermuda

People 
 Agar (name), a given name and a family name, including a list of persons with the name
 Hagar, a Biblical character, sometimes spelled as Agar

Plants and animals 
 Agar (dog) or Magyar agár, a dog breed
 Agarwood, a fragrant wood used in perfumery

Other uses 
 Agar gun, an early type of machine gun
 Agar.io, a massively multiplayer online game featuring cellular blobs
 Agar, a dialect of the Dinka language of South Sudan
 Ulawa Airport, Solomon Islands (ICAO code)
 libAgar, is a cross-platform GUI toolkit

See also 
Auger (disambiguation)
Augur (disambiguation)